Assaf "Asi" Domb (born 27 February 1974) is a retired Israeli footballer. Currently, he is a manager.

Early and personal life
Assaf Domb was born in Netanya, Israel, to a Jewish family.

His first wife, out of three, was Israeli television host and model Hilla Nachshon. He has one child from his second marriage.

Honours
Israeli Premier League (1):
1996–97
Toto Cup (1):
2001–02
Israel State Cup (1):
2006
Liga Leumit (1):
2007–08

External links
Profile at One

1974 births
Living people
Israeli Ashkenazi Jews
Israeli footballers
Israel international footballers
Maccabi Netanya F.C. players
Beitar Jerusalem F.C. players
Hapoel Tel Aviv F.C. players
F.C. Ashdod players
Bnei Yehuda Tel Aviv F.C. players
Hakoah Maccabi Amidar Ramat Gan F.C. players
Hapoel Ramat Gan F.C. players
Footballers from Netanya
Israeli Premier League players
Hapoel Kfar Saba F.C. managers
Hapoel Tel Aviv F.C. managers
Hapoel Marmorek F.C. managers
Hapoel Bnei Lod F.C. managers
Israeli people of Polish-Jewish descent
Association football defenders
Israeli football managers